Hang On to Your Resistance is the debut album by Canadian musician Tom Cochrane, originally released in 1974 on Daffodil Records. The album was released under just his last name, Cochrane. In 1987, Capitol Records re-released the album under Tom Cochrane but changed the title slightly to Hang On to Your Resistance (The Early Years).

Track listing

References

1974 debut albums
Tom Cochrane albums
Daffodil Records albums